Alophonotus is a monotypic moth genus in the family Cossidae. Alophonotus rauana, the sole species in the genus, is found in the Democratic Republic of Congo, Malawi, Senegal, South Africa, South Sudan, Tanzania, Uganda and Zimbabwe.

References

 , 2013: The Cossidae (Lepidoptera) of Malawi with descriptions of two new species. Zootaxa, 3709 (4): 371–393. Abstract:

External links

Natural History Museum Lepidoptera generic names catalog

Zeuzerinae
Monotypic moth genera
Cossidae genera
Moths of Africa